Echinopsole is a genus of sea slugs, specifically of aeolid nudibranchs. Only two species are known to belong to this genus, marine gastropod molluscs in the family Facelinidae.

Species
Species in this genus include:
 Echinopsole breviceratae Burn, 1962
 Echinopsole fulvus Macnae, 1954

References

Facelinidae